George Ellison Weeks (December 16, 1918 – March 1980) was an American football defensive end who played for one season in the National Football League (NFL). After playing college football for Alabama, he was drafted by the Philadelphia Eagles in the 14th round of the 1943 NFL Draft. He played for the Brooklyn Tigers in 1944.

References

1918 births
1980 deaths
People from Dothan, Alabama
Players of American football from Alabama
American football defensive ends
Alabama Crimson Tide football players
Brooklyn Tigers players